Nakobe Rashod Dean (born December 13, 2000) is an American football linebacker for the Philadelphia Eagles of the National Football League (NFL). He played college football at Georgia, winning the 2021 Butkus Award before being drafted by the Eagles in the third round of the 2022 NFL Draft.

High school career 
Dean played high school football at Horn Lake High School. As a senior he won the High School Butkus Award. As a five-star recruit Dean committed to Georgia after receiving offers from Ole Miss and Alabama.

College career 
As a true freshman for the Georgia Bulldogs football team, Dean recorded 25 total tackles despite battling injuries. In 2021, he won the Butkus Award given annually to college football's best linebacker and finished the season as a key member of the team that won the 2022 College Football Playoff National Championship. On January 15, 2022, Dean declared for the 2022 NFL Draft.

Professional career
Dean was invited to the 2022 NFL Scouting Combine. He performed limited positional drills due to an injury (a torn pectoral muscle) that he suffered while training for the NFL Draft.

Dean was drafted in the third round (83rd overall) of the 2022 NFL Draft by the Philadelphia Eagles. His draft-day slide was considered surprising, but NFL analyst Ian Rapoport pointed out that teams were reportedly concerned about Dean's size, and his decision to opt against getting surgery to repair his pectoral injury. Dean appeared in all 17 games as a rookie and mainly played on special teams. Dean's rookie season ended with a trip to Super Bowl LVII where the Eagles lost 38-35 to the Kansas City Chiefs.

Personal life 
Dean is a member of Omega Psi Phi fraternity and was initiated while at Georgia.
Dean's older brother, Nikolas, played tight end at Ole Miss. In 2022, Dean was named the Arthur Ashe Jr. Male Sports Scholar of the Year by Diverse: Issues In Higher Education.

References

External links
 Philadelphia Eagles bio
Georgia Bulldogs Bio

2000 births
Players of American football from Mississippi
American football linebackers
Georgia Bulldogs football players
People from DeSoto County, Mississippi
Living people
All-American college football players
Philadelphia Eagles players